Nihalani is a surname. Notable people with the surname include:
 Govind Nihalani (born 1940), Indian filmmaker
 Pahlaj Nihalani, Indian film producer, former chairman of the Central Board of Film Certification
 Shobha Nihalani, Indian author

Indian surnames